City Dairy Company Limited was a dairy company founded by Walter Edward Massey, president of Massey-Harris, to deliver milk in the city of Toronto. The company was the first Canadian dairy to supply pasteurized milk.

The dairy was founded after Massey opened his Dentonia Park farm in 1897 and raised a herd of dairy cattle. The dairy from these cows were sent to a dairy plant at 487 and 563 Spadina Crescent (see Borden Buildings). Massey died in 1901, but the dairy operations continued until it was sold to Borden in 1930 for $7 million.  By 1915 City Dairy controlled 40 per cent of the milk market in Toronto.

References

Companies based in Toronto
Dairy products companies of Canada
Food and drink companies established in 1900
1900 establishments in Ontario
Food and drink companies disestablished in 1930
1930 disestablishments in Ontario
Canadian companies established in 1900